Assetou Bamba (born 1 December 1980) is a retired Ivorian sprinter who specialized in the 100 metres.

Her best placement was a fourth place in the 4 × 100 metres relay at the 2003 All-Africa Games. She also competed individually at the 2003 All-Africa Games, the 2004 African Championships (both 100 and 200 metres) and 2005 Jeux de la Francophonie without reaching the final.

Her personal best time was 12.12 seconds, achieved at the 2004 African Championships.

References

External links

1980 births
Living people
Ivorian female sprinters
Place of birth missing (living people)
Athletes (track and field) at the 2003 All-Africa Games
African Games competitors for Ivory Coast